The 2001 Major League Baseball All-Star Game was the 72nd playing of the midsummer classic between the all-stars of the American League (AL) and National League (NL), the two leagues comprising Major League Baseball. The game was held on July 10, 2001 at Safeco Field in Seattle, Washington, home of the Seattle Mariners of the American League. The American League defeated the National League, 4–1. This was Cal Ripken Jr.'s 19th and final All-Star Game. It was also the final All-Star Game for San Diego Padres right fielder Tony Gwynn.

Roster

American League

National League

Notes
 Player declined or was unable to play
 Player replaced vacant spot on roster
 Player changed starting position

Game

Umpires

Starting lineups

Game summary

Before the start of the first inning, Alex Rodriguez voluntarily elected to switch to third base to allow Cal Ripken Jr. to play at the shortstop position one final time at the All-Star Game, which the crowd gave a standing ovation. The move allowed Ripken to set the record for most MLB All-Star appearances at shortstop (15). Seattle's own Ichiro Suzuki gave his hometown fans something to cheer for early, when in the first, he singled off starter (and former Mariner) Randy Johnson, and then stole second. Johnson stranded him at second to hold the AL scoreless in the first inning. Ripken followed this with a home run in the third inning, which also got a standing ovation, to put the AL up 1–0.

The AL scored one more run in the fifth when Iván Rodríguez singled home Jason Giambi to make it 2–0. Ryan Klesko hit a sacrifice fly to cut the lead to one in the sixth, scoring Jeff Kent from third. In the sixth, with the score 2–1, Derek Jeter and Magglio Ordóñez hit back to back home runs off Jon Lieber to extend the AL's lead to 4–1.

That ended the scoring for the night. Mariner closer Kazuhiro Sasaki retired the side in order in the ninth to secure the win for the AL. Cal Ripken was awarded the game's MVP, becoming the fourth player ever—and first from the American League—to win two All-Star Game MVP awards.

Home Run Derby

Trivia
Cal Ripken Jr., most famous during his career as a shortstop, was elected as a third baseman to start the game.  Texas Rangers shortstop Alex Rodriguez was elected to start at short. However, Rodriguez insisted that Ripken play shortstop for the first inning. American League manager Joe Torre agreed and allowed the change. When fans noticed the fielding change, they gave both players a standing ovation.
This was the first All-Star Game to be awarded by Commissioner Bud Selig after being named to that post.
American League starting pitcher Roger Clemens was booed in the pregame ceremonies for striking out 15 Mariners in a one-hit shutout in the previous season's playoffs. Also in the pregame ceremony, the Fort Lewis color guard provided the colors presentation, accompanied by Tacoma and Everett, Washington high school students who presented the flags in the outfield.  After Diana Krall and Mýa sang the Canadian and U.S. national anthems, respectively, Tony Pérez, as the only link to the 1979 All-Star Game, the only other All-Star Game in Seattle, joined the ceremonial first pitch ceremonies.
The film Summer Catch had a premiere in Seattle at the now-defunct theater chain General Cinemas Pacific Place 12 to coincide with the All-Star Game. In attendance was Meatloaf, Jessica Biel, Wilmer Valderrama and fellow That '70s Show costar Danny Masterson.

Footnotes and references

External links
All-Star Game site
Lineups, boxscore, and more

Major League Baseball All-Star Game
Major League Baseball All-Star Game
Baseball competitions in Seattle
Major League Baseball All Star Game
Major League Baseball All-Star Game
Major League Baseball All-Star Game